Chicago and North Western 1385 is an "R-1" class 4-6-0 "Ten Wheeler" type steam locomotive built in March 1907 by the American Locomotive Company (ALCO) for the Chicago and North Western Railway (C&NW). It was used for hauling freight and passenger trains for the C&NW, until its retirement in 1956. In 1961, it was purchased by a preservation group that is currently known as the Mid-Continent Railway Museum, and they have operated No. 1385 on several excursions on their tourist railroad, beginning in 1963. From 1982 to 1987, the locomotive operated on the Chicago and North Western railroad's mainline for their short-lived steam program. No. 1385 last operated in 1998, before it was disassembled for boiler maintenance. The locomotive remained in storage in the museum's yard, until 2011, when it was decided that No. 1385 would undergo a complete rebuild with a newly built boiler and a rebuilt tender. As of 2023, No. 1385 continues to undergo a rebuild to operating condition.

The locomotive was listed on the National Register of Historic Places in 2000.

History

Construction and revenue service
Between 1901 and 1908, the Chicago and North Western Railway (C&NW), also known as the North Western, ordered 325 4-6-0 "ten-wheeler" locomotives from the American Locomotive Company's (ALCO) former Schenectady Locomotive Works in Schenectady, New York, as well as the Baldwin Locomotive Works in Philadelphia, Pennsylvania. The C&NW owned more R-1s than any other steam locomotive class in their roster. No. 1385, being built by ALCO, was the 248th member of the R-1 class, and it was the eighteenth locomotive of the twelfth batch of R-1 locomotives to be built by ALCO in March 1907. At the time of their construction, the R-1 "ten-wheelers" were larger than any other steam locomotive the North Western, and rails, turntables, engine houses, and bridges had to be enlarged, in order to accommodate their size.

Although they were primarily used for pulling mainline fast freight trains, the R-1 class locomotives were also used for secondary passenger service and occasional switching service over the North Western's extensive system, mostly throughout the forests in the Upper Peninsula of Michigan, the prairies of Iowa, Nebraska, and South Dakota, and the metropolitan Chicago area in Illinois. No. 1385 underwent several modifications throughout its time on the North Western, including an October 1926 modification where its tender frame was replaced with one made of cast steel. As time progressed, No. 1385 was reassigned to pull branch line passenger and freight trains, in favor of larger locomotives, such as the E-2 class 4-6-2 "Pacifics" and the E-4 class 4-6-4 "Hudsons", taking over the mainline assignments. After 49 years of service on the North Western, No. 1385 was retired from revenue service in 1956, and it was subsequently stored in a sideline.

Early preservation years
In 1961, members of the Historical Society of Milwaukee, Wisconsin scraped together $2,600, and they purchased No. 1385 from the North Western for its scrap value with that amount. The following year, in May, the historical society changed its name to the Mid-Continent Railway Museum (MCRM), and on May 26, the MCRM publicly opened their museum ground in Hillsboro, Wisconsin. No. 1385 was coupled to the front of a ceremonial train, and it broke through a white banner before moving on Hillsboro and Northeastern Railway trackage from Hillsboro to Union Center, but the locomotive was not operational, and a diesel locomotive was pushing it from behind. In 1963, the MCRM acquired an abandoned branch line in North Freedom from the North Western, and the museum shortly thereafter moved their locomotives and rolling stock, including No. 1385, to North Freedom. The locomotive then pulled the MCRM's tourist trains between North Freedom and La Rue for the museum's first operating seasons in North Freedom from 1963 to 1965. In 1973, No. 1385 underwent a restoration process by MCRM crews, and during the process, the locomotive's original tender was found to be in poor condition. After being deemed unserviceable, the tender was moved to the end of the MCRM's line near Quartzite Lake, and it was replaced with a smaller oil tender formerly paired with fellow C&NW R-1 No. 1361, which was found to be in better condition. The smaller tender was modified with the oil bunker being removed and replaced with a high coal bunker, and it was used behind No. 1385 for the remainder of the 20th century.

Excursion Service
In 1981, the manager of the North Western's Wisconsin Division, Chris Burger, discussed with the North Western's vice president and manager of operations, Jim Zito, about initiating a safety program for the railroad, and Burger pitched the idea of a steam excursion program to Zito, taking inspiration from the success of the steam programs on the Chicago, Burlington and Quincy, Union Pacific, Southern, and Reading railroads. Zito thought a C&NW 4-8-4 "Northern" was hidden in Mexico and brought up the possibility of finding one there, but Burger had his mind set on No. 1385 as the ideal locomotive for the proposed program; it was small enough to have a wide route availability, and it was large enough to please crowds. With approval from Federal Railroad Administration (FRA) officials and the North Western's president, Jim Wolfe, and the MCRM's board of directors envisioning the benefits of taking part in a steam program hosted by a class 1 railroad, No. 1385 was to pull mainline excursion trains as a goodwill ambassador of the railroad. Before the runs could take place, the locomotive had to be inspected and repaired to be safe to operate on the North Western's mainline, so in April 1982, the locomotive traveled under its own power for two days from North Freedom to the North Western's Green Bay, Wisconsin facility, and fifteen North Western employees, led by motive power foreman, Al Kawalek, were involved. After it arrived at the Green Bay facility, the locomotive was repaired with drop pits being used to rework the wheels.

Two weeks afterwards, the No. 1385 locomotive pulled its first official train for the program; a wayfreight run between Green Bay and Oconto Falls. Beginning on May 16, No. 1385 pulled a week-long publicity tour, dubbed the "Prosperity Special" (a nod to the 1922 delivery train of the same name), throughout the North Western's Wisconsin Division as a message to the public that, although the North Western was struggling financially, they still invested in new motive power and rolling stock upgrades. The tour consisted of a newly purchased EMD GP50 locomotive and multiple freight cars the North Western had acquired and rebuilt, including a boxcar full of supplies and tools, a covered hopper car, a hopper car filled with coal, a TOFC car, and an autorack car, and a waycar and two business cars were coupled to the rear of the consist. The tour first departed Green Bay before stopping at other cities and towns throughout the tour, including Milwaukee, Janesville, Madison, and North Freedom. At one point, the tour stalled while climbing a grade near the end of a long Fox River bridge, and while crews were inspecting the train for problems, it was discovered that a control box inside No. 1385's cab, which was in control of the GP50, was wired to travel in reverse while the control was set to forward running. When the control was set to reverse, the tour proceeded forward without any other major issues.

By the time the Prosperity Special tour ended, it saw so much success from thousands of bystanders witnessing the tour, people riding in the business cars, and one leg of the tour being filmed for media outlets, that it turned a small profit for the North Western. This resulted in the manager of the North Western's Iowa Division, George Maybee, inquiring about the possibility of No. 1385 pulling public excursion trains over the Kate Shelley High Bridge out of Boone, Iowa during the annual "Pufferbilly Days" event in September. In order for the locomotive to operate in the Iowa Division, the FRA approval from the Prosperity Special was extended, and the North Western reached an agreement with Metra Commuter Rail to lease some bilevel passenger cars for the operation. When the September Pufferbilly Days event came and went, the North Western oversaw a similar outcome of success to that of the Prosperity Special tour. No. 1385 thereafter returned to the North Western's Green Bay facility to be disassembled and repaired, and the locomotive was then moved to the Milwaukee Boiler Company to be reworked, since the Milwaukee Boiler Company had offered to perform some boiler work on No. 1385 at a reasonable price, in order for the program to continue. Once the boiler work was completed, the locomotive was moved back to Green Bay to be reassembled.

After it was reassembled, No. 1385 began to pull additional excursion trains and tours for the C&NW annually throughout Wisconsin, Illinois, Iowa, Minnesota, and Michigan, beginning in late May 1983, when it pulled "Butler 400" trains within the outskirts of Milwaukee, during the "Butler Railroad Days". In doing so, the locomotive's trips were witnessed by thousands of spectators and filmed for hundreds of media outlets. In 1985, No. 1385 pulled a publicity tour on former Minneapolis and St. Louis Railway trackage from Mason City to Marshalltown, Iowa. In the summer of that same year, the locomotive was selected to pull the "Great Circus Train" for the Circus World Museum (CWM) from Baraboo, Wisconsin to Milwaukee. This was the first time a steam locomotive pulled the CWM's train in twelve years. No. 1385 pulled the consist again for two more circus events in 1986 and 1987. As the locomotive left Baraboo with the 1987 train on July 7, though, No. 1385 suffered a superheater failure, and while the train proceeded forward behind an EMD SD60, No. 1385 was towed back to North Freedom to be repaired by C&NW crews, MCRM staff, and other mechanics, in order to allow the locomotive to catch up with the Great Circus Train before it could reach Milwaukee. The repairs were completed after twelve hours, and after being test fired around 12:00 am, the No. 1385 was towed to Janesville, where it was reunited with the circus train. Despite being delayed in leaving Janesville, the train arrived at Milwaukee on time. While the circus train returned to Baraboo behind the SD60, No. 1385 was routed to the North Western's former Madison Street Station in Chicago, where it was displayed for several days, in commemoration of the sesquicentennial of the City of Chicago.

By the end of 1987, however, the trips and tours were becoming increasingly harder for the North Western's operating personnel to manage, with the railroad's divisions being consolidated and the division management being reduced. The trips also saw a slow decline in profit, as a result of rising insurance issues and bystanders sightseeing other steam locomotives, such as Nickel Plate Road 765, Norfolk and Western 611, and Union Pacific 844, operating on other railroads within the northern midwest, instead. Soon, Robert Schmiege, president of the North Western's new parent company, the Chicago and North Western Holdings Corporation, expressed that operating No. 1385 supported the already held image of railroads being low-tech antiques, and he recommended that the railroad discontinue their steam excursion program.

Final years of 20th century operations

From 1988 onwards, No. 1385 only operated on the North Western for ferry service, in order to operate on other railroads in Wisconsin. In the summer of 1992, the locomotive pulled mainline excursion trains on both the Wisconsin Central and the Wisconsin and Southern railroads throughout the cities of Brodhead, Mazomanie, Wausau, and Horicon. In October 1994, No. 1385's running gear underwent some repairs after a flood from the previous year damaged the locomotive. That same year, the locomotive was repainted as Delaware, Lackawanna and Western No. 1053 for a promotional film for Steamtown National Historic Site of Scranton, Pennsylvania. The following year, 1995, No. 1385 was repainted again to its pre-World War II C&NW livery to take part in the Chicago and North Western Historical Society's convention, which was being held in North Freedom that year. By that time, however, the MCRM was down to only two operational steam locomotives, including No. 1385, since most of their other operational steam locomotives were removed from service years prior, and the two remaining locomotives' flue times were nearing their expiration dates. In addition, the Federal Railroad Administration enforced new safety measures for North American steam locomotive operations, as a result of a backdraft accident on the Gettysburg Railroad, and the MCRM had to convert their steam operations to the new guidelines. A fundraising campaign, entitled "Help Steam Live", was started, in an attempt to raise a minimum of $250,000 to keep their steam locomotives running. In May 1998, No. 1385 traveled on Wisconsin and Southern trackage to Reedsburg, Wisconsin to take part in the city of Reedsburg's sesquicentennial celebration. July 1, 1998, was the last day No. 1385 operated in the 20th century, when it pulled one of the MCRM's tourist trains of that day, before it was stored inside the museum's shop to have its boiler repaired.

Restoration
It was initially estimated that $125,000 was required to repair the locomotive's boiler by replacing the flues and tubes and patching the inner side sheets of the firebox. However, upon further disassembly and inspection, it was discovered that after over eighty years of being used, the boiler was damaged beyond economical repair, with the firebox having the highest corrosion. The state's boiler inspector subsequently condemned the firebox from being used again, and after a lengthy boiler inspection was performed by Steam Services of America in 2001, the MCRM expanded their plan to rebuild No. 1385's boiler. As a result of the new plan, and with the museum determining that the tender, running gear, frame, and cab also needed to be rebuilt, it was re-estimated that the rebuild would cost more than the amount of money the MCRM had raised from their Help Steam Live campaign. No. 1385 was consequently stored idle in the MCRM's yard while crews concentrated their efforts on other steam locomotives that required less costly rebuilds. The locomotive's original tender, which had been partially buried in mud and gravel since a 1993 flood, was unburied and recovered in April 2002, and it was moved to a Lake Delton, Wisconsin machine shop for storage. In 2011, while the MCRM was recovering from a recession and a flood from 2008, the MCRM received a $250,000 matching grant from the Wagner Foundation of Lyons, Wisconsin, created by Dick and Bobbie Wagner, and they were interested in supporting the MCRM in bringing one of their own steam locomotives back to service. The MCRM then announced in June that No. 1385 would undergo a complete rebuild with funds from the Wagner Foundation and other doners, and assistance would be provided by nearby contractors. 

Work subsequently began by DRM Industries to reconstruct No. 1385's original tender; the original tender tank, being deemed mostly unsalvageable, was used in reference alongside original drawings for designing a new welded tank, and some original parts that were deemed salvageable, such as the coal board brackets, were reused for the new tank. The tender frame was also deemed salvageable, and it was sandblasted and painted in red oxide primer. Both tender bogies were found to be in poor condition, as a result of being buried in dirt and gravel, so a decision was made to search for replacement bogies. Some of the original tender parts that were deemed unsalvageable were either scrapped or sold off to nearby museums, such as the brake cylinder, coupler, yoke, and a draft gear being sent to a Miner corporate museum. The reconstruction process was completed in 2013; after being painted and lettered, the tender was reassembled with the new tank being united with the original frame and two replacement bogies that were formerly used for freight cars. With No. 1385's original tender being almost completely reconstructed, the smaller tender that was used behind No. 1385 throughout the 1970s, 80s, and 90s was no longer needed, and it was deaccessioned and sold off at an auction in 2015. The new tender was then put on static display at the museum's passenger depot while waiting to be paired with the locomotive once again. After the tender was reconstructed, the locomotive's original boiler was separated from the frame and sent to Deltak in Plymouth, Minnesota, where it served as a reference alongside original drawings and plans for a new welded boiler with the same specifications. It was determined that constructing a new boiler that would last another century was more logical that constantly repairing the original.

Continental Fabricators Incorporated of St. Louis, Missouri, was later hired in 2016 to construct the new welded boiler, and it took two years and $700,000 of funding to complete. In September 2019, the new boiler was shipped by truck from St. Louis, and on September 25, it arrived at SPEC Machine Works near Middleton, Wisconsin, where No. 1385's frame, running gear, and cab were also being refabricated. A 100-ton crane was used to lift the boiler from the truck trailer and place it onto the frame, and some brackets were removed, so close inspections to be made to determine whether or not parts of the frame had to be adjusted or refabricated. As of 2023, No. 1385's rebuild, now estimated to cost over $2 million to complete, continues to go underway, with gauges being fitted on the backhead of the new boiler's firebox, and the new tender being test filled with water. The MCRM is proceeding to accept grants to support the rebuild. Once the rebuild is completed, the locomotive will be moved to North Freedom by truck during the winter season while the ground has frozen.

See also
 Chicago and North Western 175
 Copper Range 29
 Lake Superior and Ishpeming 18
 Polson Logging Co. 2
 Soo Line 2645
 Soo Line 2719
 Southern Railway 4501
 Union Pacific 618
 Western Coal and Coke 1

References

Rail transportation on the National Register of Historic Places in Wisconsin
Railway locomotives introduced in 1907
Railway locomotives on the National Register of Historic Places
1385
4-6-0 locomotives
Individual locomotives of the United States
Sauk County, Wisconsin
ALCO locomotives
National Register of Historic Places in Sauk County, Wisconsin
Standard gauge locomotives of the United States
Preserved steam locomotives of Wisconsin